Lithoprocris hamon is a moth of the subfamily Arctiinae. It was described by Herbert Druce in 1902. It is found in Peru.

References

 

Lithosiini
Moths described in 1902